Elizabeth Wetmore may mean the following:

 Elizabeth Bisland Wetmore, American journalist and author;
 Elizabeth Wetmore (novelist), American author and novelist.